Doire Colmcille CLG is a Gaelic Athletic Association club based in Derry, Northern Ireland.  The club is a member of Derry GAA and currently caters for Gaelic football and Ladies' Gaelic football with a strong focus on youth development.

Doire Colmcille have won the Derry Junior Football Championship title once. Underage teams up to U-12's play in North Derry North Derry league and championships, from U-14 upwards teams compete in All-Derry competitions.

Gaelic football
Doire Colmcille fields Gaelic football teams at U8, U10, U12, U14, U16, Minor and Senior levels. They currently compete in the Derry Junior Championship and Division 2 (tier 3) of the Derry ACFL.

Well known players
Phil Friel – Played for Doire Colmcille's forerunners Sarsfields and played on Derry's 1965 All-Ireland Minor Football Championship winning team.
Shane Duffy – played with Doire Colmcille in his youth before signing a professional contract with Everton.

Ladies' Gaelic football
The club also has had a number of Ladies' sides. Starting from Under 16s to Ladies Senior teams. In 2008 three of Doire Colmcille senior ladies represented Derry in the All-Ireland Junior football final against London at Croke Park.
After having problems with numbers, there is now a ladies and underage girls teams.

Well known players
Una Harkin – played with Doire Colmcille in her youth and also played soccer for Northern Ireland.

History
Doire Colmcille CLG was established in 1969 following the amalgamation of 3 city clubs – Daire Óg, Éire Óg and Sarsfields. Doire Colmcille was born out of humble beginnings, with only representation being a Men's Senior Football team.

The club won the Derry Junior Football Championship in 1974 and is the only Derry City side to have played in Intermediate ranks for the majority of its existence. Over the past 35 years Doire Colmcille CLG has continuously grown to serve the local Gaelic community, and now is represented by no fewer than 10 individual footballing teams spanning both men's and ladies from U-12 right through to senior. Doire Colmcille CLG is governed by an elected executive committee comprising 11 officers from chairman right through to ladies and men's playing representatives. All officers are elected by full members at the club's annual general meeting

The club's most successful underage team came in the late 1990s producing players such as Emmet Mc Gilloway, Mark Chambers James Mc Quillan jnr and Brian Rainey all playing at county level and Maclarnon cup winners with St Columbs college in 2002 players such as Mark Chambers, Ronan Cassidy, Conor Lynch, Simon Coyle and Raymond Mc Nally. On the current minor team, Pearse O Doherty, and Matt Fincham have all represented Doire Colmcille at county vocational schools level and county level, as well as under 16 players Ismail Dogachi and Vinny Mc Cormack representing Derry U-16 this year. The club's under 14 squad in 2004 entered the All Ireland Feile Peil an Og competition in county Tyrone. Finishing second in their group, group winners and hosts St Malachys Moortown went on to progress to the knockout stages. The u-14s had wins over St Michaels (county Westmeath) and Derrytresk (county Tyrone). In 2005 the club's under 14 squad did the double winning both league and championship to make it a season not to forget going unbeaten that whole year. Then in 2006 success continued as the next crop of under 14s won the North Derry league again going undefeated but unfortunately bowing out of the championship semi-finals that year.  The club's seniors is currently playing in the Junior Championship again.

Honours

Senior
 Derry Junior Football Championship: 1
 1974

Minor
North Derry Minor 'A' Football League: 1
1997
North Derry Minor 'B' Football League: 1
1996

Under-16
 North Derry Under-16 'B' Football League: 1
 1993

Under-14
 North Derry Under-14 'C' Football Championship: 1
 2005
 North Derry Under-14 'C' Football League: 1
 2005
 North Derry Under-14 'B' Football League: 1
 2006
.   Under-14 B Championship (ladies)
 2020

See also
List of Gaelic games clubs in Derry

External links
Doire Colmcille CLG website

References

Gaelic games clubs in County Londonderry
Gaelic football clubs in County Londonderry